WIMA may refer to:

Werner Icking Music Archive
WIMA (AM), an AM radio station located in Lima, Ohio
WIMA Spezialvertrieb elektronischer Bauelemente GmbH & Co.KG, a capacitor manufacturer company
Women's International Motorcycle Association